Silana is a village in Sonipat district of Haryana, situated 10 kilometers west from Sonipat.

Villages in Sonipat district